Utrechtiaceae is an extinct family of trees related to modern conifers. This family dates back to the late Carboniferous and Early Permian.

Description
They were forest trees with almost horizontal standing leafy lateral shoots  and with vertical tribes. They were generally small trees. At least with Utrechtia piniformis the side shoots are in whorls.

Like other Voltzialean plants, they had compact ovulate cones bearing bilateral bract-scale complexes. The leaves are scale-like, arranged spirally and only a few millimeters long.

Genera
Utrechtiaceae include the following selected genera:
 Ernestiodendron Florin, 1934 
 Lebachiella S.V. Meyen, 1997
 Ortiseia R. Florin, 1964
 Moyliostrobus C.N. Miller & J.T. Brown, 1973 : known from the Lower Permian of Texas (Moyliostrobus texanum).
 Otovicia
 Utrechtia G.W. Rothwell & G. Mapes, 2003

See also

References

 Paleobiology Database
 Charles B. Beck: Origin and Evolution of Gymnosperms. Columbia University Press, New York 1988 
 Wilson Nichols Stewart,Gar W. Rothwell  Paleobotany and the Evolution of Plants
 G.W. Rothwell, Gene Mapes  Validation of the names Utrechtiaceae, Utrechtia, and Utrechtia floriniformis
 Edith L. Taylor,Thomas N. Taylor,Michael Krings Paleobotany: The Biology and Evolution of Fossil Plants Prentice Hall, Englewood Cliffs 1993, S. 676-679. 

Voltziales
Prehistoric plant families